Reynolds William Webb (14 April 1900 – 22 June 1989) was an Australian rules footballer who played with Collingwood in the Victorian Football League (VFL).

Webb was a rover and forward during his time at Collingwood.

He played in two losing grand finals, the 1922 VFL Grand Final and 1925 VFL Grand Final.

Webb represented the VFL in 1925, against New South Wales.

References

External links

 
 

1900 births
Australian rules footballers from Melbourne
Collingwood Football Club players
1989 deaths
People from Collingwood, Victoria